Wang Bin (born November 1958) is a former Chinese business executive and senior economist who served as chairman and party secretary of China Life Insurance Company from 2018 to 2022 and chairman and party secretary of  from 2012 to 2018. As of January 2022 he was under investigation by China's top anti-corruption agency. He was a representative of the 19th National Congress of the Chinese Communist Party and a member of the Social and Legal Affairs Committee of the 13th National Committee of the Chinese People's Political Consultative Conference.

Biography
Wang was born in Harbin, Heilongjiang, in November 1958. During the late Cultural Revolution, he worked as a sent-down youth in a farm of his home-province. Beginning in July 1983, he served in several posts in Heilongjiang Provincial People's Government, including staff of Department of Commerce, staff of Economic Reform Commission, and secretary of General Office of Heilongjiang Provincial People's Government. He joined the Chinese Communist Party in February 1985.

In September 1990, he became deputy director of Heilongjiang Branch Office of the People's Bank of China, and nine months later, he was transferred to Beijing and appointed head of Secretariat of the General Office of the People's Bank of China. He served in various posts in the Agricultural Development Bank of China before serving as president of Tianjin Branch of the Bank of Communications in January 2000. In December 2002, he was appointed president of Beijing Branch of the Bank of Communications. After this office was terminated in May 2005, he became vice president of the Bank of Communications, serving until March 2012. 

Downfall
On 8 January 2022, Wang was put under investigation for alleged "serious violations of discipline and laws" by the Central Commission for Discipline Inspection (CCDI), the party's internal disciplinary body, and the National Supervisory Commission, the highest anti-corruption agency of China. On September 1, he was expelled from the CCP and dismissed from public office.

References

1958 births
Living people
People from Harbin
Southwestern University of Finance and Economics alumni
Nankai University alumni
People's Republic of China economists
Businesspeople from Heilongjiang
People's Republic of China politicians from Heilongjiang
Chinese Communist Party politicians from Heilongjiang
Expelled members of the Chinese Communist Party